Zhu Baojie (Pinyin: Zhū Bǎojié;  born 11 August 1989 in Liuzhou, Guangxi) is a Chinese footballer, who currently plays as a midfielder for Shanghai Greenland Shenhua.

Club career
Zhu Baojie began his professional football career playing for Shaanxi Chanba and would go on to make his debut on July 2, 2008, in a league game against Qingdao Jonoon in a 3–1 victory. This was to be his only game for the team before he moved to second tier side Nanchang Bayi where he was given the opportunity to be a first team regular. While initially Zhu found it difficult to adjust within the team the head coach Zhu Jiong showed faith with him while the team pushed for promotion. This turned out to be a success and Nanchang came second in the division, winning promotion to the top tier. On 26 May 2010, he scored his first senior goal in a 1–1 home draw against Dalian Shide.
On 29 January 2014, Zhu transferred to fellow Chinese Super League side Guangzhou R&F.

On 5 January 2015, Zhu transferred to fellow Chinese Super League side Guizhou Renhe. He would make his debut for the club in a league game on March 7, 2015, against Liaoning Whowin F.C. that ended in a 1–0 defeat. This was followed by his first goal for the team on April 17, 2015, against Beijing Guoan F.C. that ended in a 2–2 draw. While he would establish himself as a regular within the team by making twenty appearances within the league he was unfortunately a member of the squad that saw the club relegated at the end of the 2015 league season. At the beginning of the  2016 league season the club would move cities to Beijing and rename themselves Beijing Renhe. Zhu would stay with the team and at the end of the  2017 league season he was part of the squad that gained promotion back into the top tier.

Career statistics
Statistics accurate as of match played 31 December 2022.

References

External links
Player stats at Soccerway.com
Player stats at sohu.com

1989 births
Living people
People from Liuzhou
Chinese footballers
Footballers from Guangxi
Shanghai Shenxin F.C. players
Guangzhou City F.C. players
Beijing Renhe F.C. players
Shanghai Shenhua F.C. players
Chinese Super League players
China League One players
Association football midfielders